The Deputy Chief Minister of the National Capital Territory of Delhi is the deputy to the Chief Minister of the National Capital Territory of Delhi, who is head of the government of the National Capital Territory of Delhi. The deputy chief minister is the second highest-ranking member of the National Capital Territory of Delhi Council of Ministers. A deputy chief minister also holds a cabinet portfolio in the capital territory ministry. In the legislative assembly system of government, the chief minister is treated as the "first among equals" in the cabinet; the position of deputy chief minister is used to govern the capital territory with the support of a single party member or to bring political stability and strength within a coalition government, or in times of capital territory emergency, when a proper chain of command is necessary. On multiple occasions, proposals have arisen to make the post permanent, but without result. The same goes for the post of deputy prime minister at the national level.

Since 1952, National Capital Territory of Delhi has had only one deputy chief minister, who belongs to Aam Aadmi Party, its one of the founding members Manish Sisodia is an inaugural and current holder of the office who sworn in two times by winning the 2015 and 2020 assembly elections consecutively.

The current government does not have a deputy chief minister, and the post has been vacant since 1 March 2023.

List                      
       
Key
  Assassinated or died in office
  Returned to office after a previous non-consecutive term
  Resigned

See also
 List of current Indian deputy chief ministers
 History of the National Capital Territory of Delhi
 Elections in the National Capital Territory of Delhi
 National Capital Territory of Delhi Legislative Assembly
 List of chief ministers of the National Capital Territory of Delhi
 List of lieutenant governors of the National Capital Territory of Delhi

Notes

References

Deputy Chief Ministers of Delhi